Macedonia is an Unincorporated community in northern Liberty County, Texas.

In 1914 a syndicate in Chicago, Illinois purchased  of land near the Beaumont, Sour Lake and Western Railway to form a community of Greek people that was intended to supply truck crops to supply the Galveston and Houston markets. The syndicate named the community "Macedonia," after a Baptist church in the area that had been established in 1845. Some Greek people worked at the local sawmills; the community did not organize in a manner that the founders had intended. A post office opened in 1915 and closed in 1922. Population estimates in subsequent decades ranged from 15 to 25. In the 1950s the population was mostly African-American. In 1984 several scattered buildings and a church remained at the site.

References

External links

 

Unincorporated communities in Liberty County, Texas
Unincorporated communities in Texas